SEGH-CFE 1 is a photovoltaic project immediately adjacent to the Comisión Federal de Electricidad  power station in Puerto Libertad, Sonora in Mexico, approximately  south of the United States border.  The project is developed by Sonora Energy Group Hermosillo, S.A. de C.V., a privately owned company.

The project, will have capacity of 46.8 MW. The array will consist of 164,211 solar panels. Project EPC responsibilities are being provided by American Electric Technologies Inc. along with combiner boxes, inverters, transformers and switch-yard equipment (NASDAQ: AETI).   Substation equipment and interconnect responsibilities are being provided by ABB (NASDAQ:  ABB).

Over the course of each year for the next twenty years, the project will generate approximately 107,000,000 kWh of electricity.

All of the electricity will be sold directly to the CFE and absorbed into the utility’s transmission system for distribution throughout their existing network.  At an installed capacity of 46.8 MWp, when complete in 2013, the project will be the first utility scale project of its kind in Mexico and the largest solar project of any kind in Latin America.  The company has permit applications for three additional projects under review by Mexican officials.

See also 

 Electricity sector in Mexico
 Solar power in Mexico

References

External links
 CFE official site
 Sonora Energy Group official site

Photovoltaic power stations in Mexico